Charles John Biddle (April 30, 1819 – September 28, 1873) was an American soldier, lawyer, congressman, and newspaper editor.

Biography
Biddle was born and died in Philadelphia, Pennsylvania. He was the son of Nicholas Biddle, president of the Second Bank of the United States, and nephew of Congressman Richard Biddle. Charles Biddle graduated from Princeton in 1837, where he studied law, and was admitted to the bar in 1840.

Biddle served in the Mexican–American War, serving as captain and company commander in the Regiment of Voltigeurs and Foot Riflemen. He was brevetted to the rank of major for gallantry in the Battle of Chapultepec. At the close of the war, he returned to Philadelphia to practice law.

In May 1861, following the outbreak of the American Civil War and President Abraham Lincoln's call to arms, he was appointed a lieutenant colonel in the Pennsylvania Reserves, rising in May to the rank of colonel in command of the 42nd Pennsylvania Volunteers Infantry (13th Reserves), also known as the 1st Pennsylvania Rifles. In October of that year he was elected to the Thirty-seventh United States Congress to fill the vacancy caused by the resignation of Edward J. Morris. He was tendered a commission as a brigadier general, but declined it, and then resigned from the army in February 1862.

After the war, he became one of the proprietors and editor-in-chief of the Philadelphia Age, and retained that position for the remainder of his life. His literary work was confined mainly to editorial contributions to the columns of this journal. His only separate publication was The Case of Major André, a carefully prepared essay read before the Historical Society of Pennsylvania, which vindicated the action of George Washington. The immediate occasion was a passage in Lord Mahon's History of England that denounced the execution of André as the greatest blot upon Washington's record. By an authority so high as the London Critic, this essay was subsequently pronounced a fair refutation of Lord Mahon's charge.

See also

Notes

References
 – section at the bottom of his father's biography

Further reading

The Political Graveyard

1819 births
1873 deaths
Princeton University alumni
Charles John
American military personnel of the Mexican–American War
Members of the Aztec Club of 1847
Pennsylvania Reserves
People of Pennsylvania in the American Civil War
Union Army officers
Democratic Party members of the United States House of Representatives from Pennsylvania
American people of English descent
19th-century American politicians
Burials at St. Peter's churchyard, Philadelphia